"Tere Te" is a Punjabi pop single by Guru Randhawa featuring Ikka Singh, released on 26 November 2018 by T-Series.

Background 
The song is sung by Guru Randhawa and Ikka Singh, penned by Ikka Singh and Music by Vee. Music video also features Zaara Yesmin, Released on 26 November 2018 by T-Series via YouTube and other music streaming services. Song Assisted by Vatsal Chevli @headroom Studio.

In an interview; Guru Randhawa reveals: “We shot this song in a Mumbai studio with special VFX for the first time.”

Reception 
The song's music video got 33 million views in 24 hours of its release.

References 

2018 singles
Guru Randhawa songs
Indian songs
Punjabi-language songs
T-Series (company) singles